Yamin may refer to:
 Yamin Yisrael, a political party in Israel
 Mount Yamin, a mountain in Indonesia
 Yemin Moshe, a neighborhood in Jerusalem

People 
Given name
 Yamin Abou-Zand (1986–2017), known by the nom de guerre Abu Umar al-Almani, a prominent German military commander of the Islamic State of Iraq and the Levant

Surname
 Aamer Yamin (born 1990), Pakistani cricketer
 Elliott Yamin (born 1978), Jewish American singer of Iraqi origin
 Elliott Yamin (album)
 Mohammad Yamin, Indonesian poet, playwright and politician

See also 
 Yammine, a surname
 Yemin (disambiguation)
 Yemen (Yaman (disambiguation), Yamaniyya)
 Yamina